Avid DNxHR, which stands for "Digital Nonlinear Extensible High Resolution", is a lossy UHDTV post-production codec engineered for multi-generation compositing with reduced storage and bandwidth requirements. The codec was specifically developed for resolutions considered above FHD/1080p, including 2K, 4K and 8K resolution. DNxHD will continue to be used for HD resolutions.

On September 12, 2014, Avid Technology, Inc. announced the DNxHR codec as part of a broader "Avid Resolution Independence" announcement at their Fall 2014 Avid Connect event, which was held during the IBC 2014 conference in Amsterdam, Netherlands.

On December 22, 2014, Avid released Media Composer 8.3 which included support for 4K project formats and the DNxHR codec. Further details for the DNxHR codec were outlined in the "Avid High-Resolution Workflows Guide - December 2014".

Uses 
It is used in both hardware and software. For example, some camera monitors with recording capability can record to this format for using in post production editing software.

Preliminary Specifications 

DNxHR is available in the following flavors:

 DNxHR LB - Low Bandwidth (8-bit 4:2:2) Offline Quality 
 DNxHR SQ - Standard Quality (8-bit 4:2:2) (suitable for delivery format)
 DNxHR HQ - High Quality (8-bit 4:2:2) 
 DNxHR HQX - High Quality (12-bit 4:2:2) (UHD/4K Broadcast-quality delivery)
 DNxHR 444 - Finishing Quality (12-bit 4:4:4)  (Cinema-quality delivery)

Bandwidth requirements for the codec and its different flavors have been announced in the "Avid High Resolution Workflows Guide - December 2014" on page 111.

Updated August 2015 avid.force.com "DNxHR Codec Bandwidth Specifications".

References 

Video codecs